Henry Puryear Cole was an American basketball player and coach. He played for the Trinity Blue and White (now the Duke Blue Devils) from 1918 to 1920, serving as the team's player-coach in the 1918–19 season. Heart trouble led to  Cole quitting basketball in 1920.

Head coaching record

References

External links
H.P. Cole at Sports-Reference.com

Duke Blue Devils men's basketball coaches
Duke Blue Devils men's basketball players
American men's basketball players